Widnes Saints are a rugby league team based in Widnes, Cheshire. They play in the North West Premier Division of the Rugby League Conference.

History
Widnes Saints were formed in 2004 operating from the Widnes St Maries premises. The club joined the North West Division of the Rugby League Conference. The first season was a success with the Saints winning their Division and the Harry Jepson Trophy at their first attempt at the Conference Grand Final against West London Sharks.

After two relatively poor seasons the Saints turned things round with the use of some of youth players produced by Widnes St Maries blending with some of the more experienced players from around the borough.

The 2007 Season saw the Saints finish second in the North West Division behind Liverpool Buccaneers but the Saints managed to overturn them in the play-offs to win the division title. Wins against Edinburgh Eagles and Rossington Sharks saw the Saints reach their second Grand Final in four seasons. They defeated Bedford Tigers to lift the RLC Regional title.

The Saints stepped up to the newly created North West Premier Division for the 2009 season. They finished second in the table but were beaten 20-10 in the final by Lymm RL. Saints withdrew from the North West Premier Division in 2010.

Club honours
 Harry Jepson Trophy: 2004
 RLC Regional: 2007
 RLC North West Division: 2004, 2007, 2008

External links
 Official site

Rugby League Conference teams
Rugby league teams in Cheshire
2004 establishments in England
Rugby clubs established in 2004
Sport in Widnes
English rugby league teams